Bharai are a Muslim community found in India and Pakistan. They are settled in the states of Himachal Pradesh and Punjab in India, and in Punjab province and Karachi in Pakistan.  They are also known as Parahin and in Uttar Pradesh, the Bharai are also commonly known as Sheikh Sarwari. It is also the name of a Jat and Rajput clan.

Origin 

The Bharai were traditionally priests of the Sultani sect, a syncretic sect with combined elements of Hinduism and Islam.  The Sultanis were followers of the Sufi saint Sultan Sakhi Sarwar of Dera Ghazi Khan in what is now Pakistan. Most Sultanis were members of the Hindu Jat community, but the Bharai were always Muslim, and belonged either to the Muslim Jat or Muslim Rajput castes. The Jat Bharai claim descent from one Garba Jat, a Hindu attendant at the shrine of Sakhi Sarwar, who said to have been instructed by the Sakhi Sarwar to convert to Islam in a dream. There are various theories as to the origin of the word Bharai.

Present circumstances 

The Bharai are now mainly settled agriculturists. Many Bharai are involved in rearing cattle, and the community are considered fairly skilled in this activity. Important subsidiary occupation includes service in the army, police and forestry service.

Although Sunni, the Bharai still pay special reverence to Sultan Sakhi Sarwar.

References 

Social groups of Pakistan
Social groups of Punjab, India
Social groups of Himachal Pradesh
Muslim communities of India
Punjabi tribes